The Club Atlético Angelópolis is a Mexican football club based in Puebla City. The club was founded in 2020, and currently plays in the Serie B of Liga Premier.

History
The team was founded in October 2020 as Atlético Rivadavia, having its field in San Pedro Cholula, a municipality belonging to the Puebla metro area. Originally, the team participated in alternate leagues to those organized by the Mexican Football Federation.

In 2022, the team began procedures to join the FMF, finally in July the club was accepted into the Liga Premier de México, being placed in Serie B, for which it began to compete in professional soccer in Mexico. The team announced Óscar Rojas as its first manager. 

This is the second professional football team in Puebla since the dissolution of Lobos BUAP in the summer of 2019.

Players

First-team squad

References

External links 

Association football clubs established in 2020
Football clubs in Puebla
2020 establishments in Mexico
Liga Premier de México